The Calhoun Downtown Historic District in Calhoun, Georgia is a  area which was listed on the National Register of Historic Places in 2011. The district includes 44 contributing buildings and 12 non-contributing ones.

It includes works by architect William F. Cann and others. In the Great Locomotive Chase, the train stopped here.

It includes:
old U.S. Post Office building, which in 2011 was serving as the Calhoun police station
Gordon County Courthouse (1962)

References

External links

Historic districts on the National Register of Historic Places in Georgia (U.S. state)
National Register of Historic Places in Gordon County, Georgia
Buildings and structures completed in 1877
1877 establishments in Georgia (U.S. state)